The 2012 season was Kelantan's 4th season in the Malaysia Super League. Kelantan were defending Malaysia Super League champions and aimed for 2nd league title this season. Furthermore, they were competing in the AFC Cup for the first time. In addition, they were also competing in the domestic tournaments, the FA Cup and the Malaysia Cup.

Competitions

Charity Shield

The Sultan Haji Ahmad Shah Cup, more popularly known as Piala Sumbangsih (Charity Cup) is an annual soccer match currently contested by the current Malaysia Cup winner and the current Super League Malaysia winner.

The match was played at National Stadium, Bukit Jalil on 7 January 2012, with kick-off at 8.45pm.

League

Results by match

League table

FA Cup

Malaysia Cup

Group B

Knockout stage

Final
The final was played on 20 October 2012 at the Shah Alam Stadium, Shah Alam in Selangor, Malaysia.

AFC Cup

First team squad

Statistics

Goalscoreres

Source: Competitions

Transfers

All start dates are pending confirmation.

In

Out

Loans In

Loans Out

See also
 List of Kelantan FA seasons

References

Kelantan FA
2012
Kelantan